Clan of Amazons may refer to:

Clan of Amazons (1978 film), a 1978 Hong Kong film
Clan of Amazons (1996 film), a 1996 Hong Kong film